Preston Love Jr. (born July 4, 1942) is an American politician and activist who served as Jesse Jackson's campaign manager during the 1984 Democratic primaries. He is the first black person to receive the support of a major political party for United States Senate in Nebraska, as he was endorsed by the Nebraska Democratic Party for the 2020 United States Senate election in Nebraska, challenging incumbent Senator Ben Sasse.

Early life

Preston Love Jr. was born in the early 1940s to Betty and Preston Love. In 1966, Love graduated with a degree in economics and later became a junior executive in IBM. The musician Laura Love is his younger half-sister.

Career

In 1983, Love worked for Harold Washington during Chicago's mayoral election. During the 1984 Democratic primaries Love was selected by Jesse Jackson to serve as Jackson's presidential campaign manager. In 1990, he formed an organization to recommend the addition of the contributions of black Nebraskans to the Nebraska Blue Book. In 1992, Love ran for a seat on the Metropolitan Utilities District board, but later withdrew to recover from his cocaine addiction. Love later became the 2nd associate chairman of the Nebraska Democratic Party and first vice-president of the Omaha NAACP.

Chris Janicek won the Democratic Senatorial nomination for the 2020 United States Senate election in Nebraska. However, during the campaign, he sent out sexually inappropriate text messages to staffers, causing the Nebraska Democratic Party to withdraw its support from him. The Nebraska Democratic Party attempted to replace Janicek with Alisha Shelton, but Janicek refused to drop out preventing the replacement. Love later announced his intention to run a write-in senatorial campaign and received the support of the Nebraska Democratic Party, making him the first black person to receive the support of a major party for United States Senate in Nebraska.

References

External links
 Campaign website 

1940s births
20th-century African-American people
21st-century African-American politicians
21st-century American politicians
African-American people in Nebraska politics
Bellevue University alumni
Candidates in the 2020 United States Senate elections
Living people
Nebraska Democrats
Nebraska politicians
University of Nebraska–Lincoln alumni